The Peace Canyon Dam is a large hydroelectric dam on the Peace River in northern British Columbia, Canada.

There are no guided tours at the Peace Canyon Dam and entry to the building is off-limits. There is a very nice view point at the Dam, with picnic tables and panels containing information about the Dam.

See also 

 List of electrical generating stations in Canada
List of generating stations in BC

References

External links 
 Peace Canyon Dam Visitor Centre

Dams in British Columbia
Peace River Regional District
Museums in British Columbia
Hydroelectric power stations in British Columbia
Dams completed in 1980
Gravity dams
Dams on the Peace River
BC Hydro
Publicly owned dams in Canada